Adolf Wolff (1883–1944) was a visual artist, anarchist, and socialist based in New York City.

References 

 
 
 
 
 

1883 births
1944 deaths
Artists from Brussels
Artists from New York City
American anarchists